Flo is a historic parish (socken) in the Swedish province of Västergötland. Since 1971 it has been a part of Grästorp Municipality.

Geology
Flo parish is the namesake for the Floian stage, which is the second stage of the Lower Ordovician. The base of the Floian is defined at the Diabasbrottet quarry type section (GSSP) 5 km to the northwest of Flo. The base is defined in the quarry as the lowest stratigraphic occurrence of the graptolite species Tetragraptus approximatus.

References

 
Populated places in Västra Götaland County